Parapexopsis is a genus of parasitic flies in the family Tachinidae. There are at least two described species in Parapexopsis.

Species
These two species belong to the genus Parapexopsis:
 Parapexopsis cavifacies Herting, 1973
 Parapexopsis cephalotes Mesnil, 1953

References

Further reading

 
 
 
 

Tachinidae
Articles created by Qbugbot